The Bharatiya Kisan Sangh (BKS) is an Indian farmers' organization that is politically linked to the Rashtriya Swayamsevak Sangh, and a member of the Sangh Parivar. BKS was founded by Dattopant Thengadi in 1978. As of 2000, Rashtriya Swayamsevak Sangh claimed BKS had a quarter million members, organized in 11,000 villages and 301 districts across the country. The organization is dominated by landed gentry.

Founding
The first chapter of BKS to be formed was its Rajasthan branch, founded on 13 March 1978. The all India organization of BKS was announced by Thengadi on 4 March 1979 at the first All India Conference of BKS in Kota. The 650 delegates at the 1979 conference had been handpicked by Thengadi, who travelled across the country to meet with farmers' representatives. The launch of BKS was preceded by earlier efforts of RSS to organize the peasantry. In the 1960s, RSS had organized farmers in the Vidharba region, and again in 1972 in Uttar Pradesh. The RSS effort to build an agrarian front, parallel to Bharatiya Mazdoor Sangh trade union movement, had however failed to attract major mass support.

1980s
On 26 February 1981 the BKS held a mass rally at the Andhra Pradesh Legislative Assembly in Hyderabad, the first major farmers mobilization after the Green Revolution. The organizing of peasants in areas of Andhra Pradesh such as Karimnagar District, Nizamabad District and Warangal District led to tensions with the dominant Naxal movement in the area, and in February 1984 BKS Karimnagar District Secretary Gopal Reddy and  Ramchander Rao (a RSS taluk-level organizer) were killed in Jagityal. In July 1985 BKS organized a mass rally at the Rajasthan Legislative Assembly, a protest movement that forced the state government to lower electricity prices.

In 1986–1987 BKS led a mass movement in Gujarat, culminating in a violent gherao of the Gujarat Legislative Assembly in March 1987. The campaign began in October 1986, following two years of drought in the state. On 1 January 1987 a mass rally of 400,000 people was held in Vijaypur. The movement culminated in the gherao of the Legislative Assembly, at which police fire killed four demonstrators at the 19 March 1987 gherao, and one police officer was killed by the demonstrators. The BKS leadership was arrested and the organization declared an indefinite state-wide bandh following the clashes. The 1986–1987 Gujarat movement was marked by a competition between BKS (based mainly in northern Gujarat, with some influence in central Gujarat) and the Khedut Samaj and Kisan Sanghatana (based in south Gujarat). Whilst the movement had a larger charter of demands, its key demand was the lowering of electricity prices for farmers. BJP supported the BKS agitation, as means of countering the influence of Sharad Joshi in the state.

Later history
With its base among wealthier farmers, BKS supported the privatization of inputs and increased mechanization of agriculture in the 1990s. In Gujarat BKS became primarily dominated by cotton farmers, an export-oriented cash crop.

BKS held its sixth national conference in Hastinapur in 1999, addressed by RSS sarsanghchalak Rajendra Singh. At the time, Kunvarji Bhai Jadhav, was the BKS president. Anand Prakash Singhal, elder brother of VHP head Ashok Singhal and a US-educated agriculturist, played a significant role in the BKS. He was instrumental in India obtaining the patent for cow urine.

Political line
BKS describes itself as an apolitical organization, and its by-laws indicate that the BKS banner is ochre colour (rather than the nearly identical saffron colour of the RSS banner). The organization describes itself as an organization 'by farmers, for farmers', promoting agricultural self-reliance. Organizers of BKS are generally RSS members or sympathizers, its leader is largely pro-Bharatiya Janata Party. The motto of the organization, in Sanskrit, is 'Krithi Mit Krishwa' ('Do farming yourself'), taken from the Rig Veda. The organization opposes genetically modified crops in oilseed production.

Whilst politically close to BJP, its relations with the party hasn't always been uncomplicated. When Narendra Modi, as Chief Minister of Gujarat, increased electricity prices in 2003 the BKS launched a protest movement against the BJP government, with a 50,000 strong protest in Gandhinagar. The BJP responded by evicting the BKS from its state headquarters at the Members of Legislative Assembly quarters. The RSS intervened, trying to reconcile BKS and BJP in the state. But in Gujarat BKS refused to support BJP in the 2004 Indian general election. In 2007, the BKS showed resentment with the ruling Bharatiya Janata Party (BJP) government in Gujarat. Dissatisfied with the prevailing cotton prices, it led to farmers' agitation in Saurashtra.

In September 2020, the BKS also protested against the agriculture bills passed by the Parliament and asked for modifications to the bill.

References

External links
Official Website

Political organisations based in India
Sangh Parivar
Agricultural organisations based in India
Hindu organizations
1978 establishments in India
Organizations established in 1978